The Roman Catholic Archdiocese of Malanje is an archdiocese located in Malanje, Angola. Until its elevation to an archdiocese in 2011, it belonged to the Ecclesiastical province of Luanda, like the two dioceses over which it has now oversight: the Diocese of Uíje and the Diocese of Ndalatando.

History
 25 November 1957: Established as Diocese of Malanje from the Metropolitan Archdiocese of Luanda and Diocese of Silva Porto
 12 April 2011: Elevated to Archdiocese

Statistics
The Archdiocese has an area of 107,000 km², a total population of 1,090,000, a Catholic population of 500,000, 49 priests, and 140 religious.

Special churches
The Cathedral of the diocese is Sé Catedral de Nossa Senhora da Assunção (Cathedral Church of the Assumption of Our Lady) in Malanje.

Bishops

Ordinaries, in reverse chronological order
 Archbishops of Malanje (Roman rite), below
 Archbishop Luzizila Kiala (29 September 2021 – ...) 
 Archbishop Benedito Roberto, C.S.Sp. (19 May 2012  – 8 November 2020)
 Archbishop Luis María Pérez de Onraíta (12 April 2011  – 19 May 2012); see below
 Bishops of Malanje (Roman rite), below
 Bishop Luis María Pérez de Onraita Aguirre (27 August 1998 – 04.12=2011); see above
 Bishop Eugénio Salessu (3 February 1977  – 27 August 1998)
 Bishop Alexandre do Nascimento (10 August 1975  – 3 February 1977), appointed Archbishop of Lubango; future Cardinal
 Bishop Eduardo André Muaca (25 September 1973  – 10 August 1975), appointed Coadjutor Archbishop of Luanda
 Bishop Pompeu de Sá Leão y Seabra, C.S.Sp. (20 December 1962  – 7 April 1973)
 Bishop Manuel Nunes Gabriel (5 December 1957  – 13 February 1962), appointed Coadjutor Archbishop of Luanda

Coadjutor bishop
Luis María Pérez de Onraita Aguirre (1995-1998)

Suffragan dioceses

 Diocese of Ndalatando
 Diocese of Uíje

See also
Roman Catholicism in Angola

Sources
 GCatholic.org

Malanje
Christian organizations established in 1957
Roman Catholic dioceses and prelatures established in the 20th century
 
Roman Catholic archbishops of Malanje